Metalurhiv is a station on Dnipro Metro's Tsentralno–Zavodska Line. It is a single-vault deep subway station, accessible only by an escalator and was opened on 29 December 1995 along with the rest of the system's first stations. The station is located on the Serhiy Nigoyan Avenue, near the Organ music centre. The station is named Metalurhiv for the steel-makers of the city and metallurgical plant located nearby.

External links

  - Metallurgiv Station

Dnipro Metro stations
Railway stations opened in 1995